= Toledo do Brasil =

Brazilian company

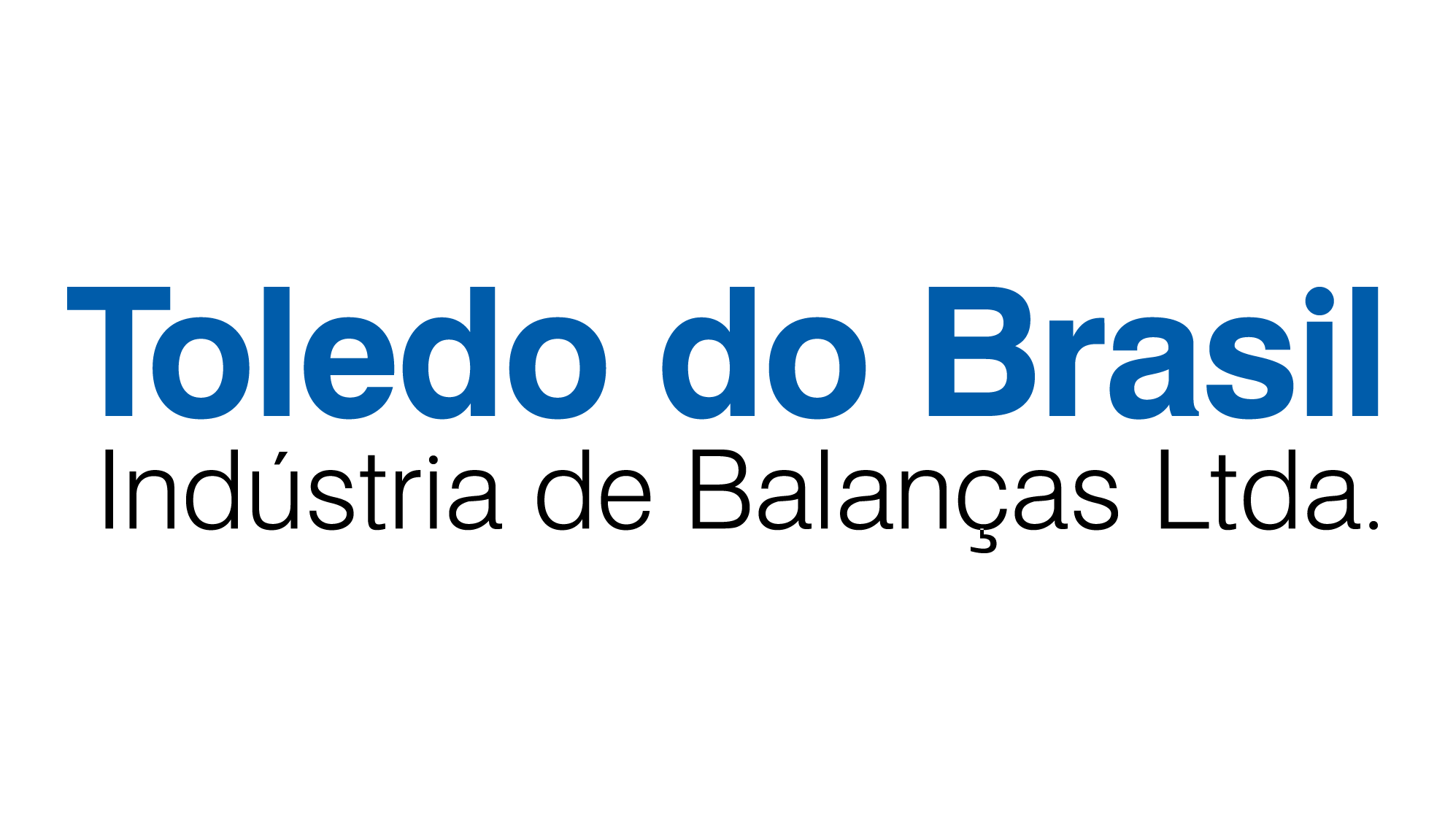
- Type: Private
- Industry: Metallurgy
- Founded: 1956
- Headquarters: São Bernardo do Campo, Brazil
- Area served: Brazil, Latin America, Africa and other countries
- Revenue: ▲ R$ 888 million, net of taxes (2024)
- Number of employees: 1,800

Toledo do Brasil is a Brazilian company, provider of solutions in hardware, software and services in weighing, food slicers and electronic labels for the retail trade. It has a strong presence in the markets in which it operates and coverage throughout the Brazilian territory. With annual revenues in 2024 of R$ 888 million, net of taxes, it continuously invests in research, design, manufacturing, service, technical support and services to meet a wide range of weighing needs, including management and automation of weighing and cubing processes.

Toledo do Brasil has a factory in São Bernardo do Campo, SP, which serves as its headquarters, with a covered area of 21,500 m² on a plot of 60,000 m², and 24 sales and service branches in the main cities of the country. It employs more than 1,800 employees, with more than 400 service technicians, including 80 technicians residing in cities where there are no branches. In addition, it has more than 2,000 dealers and 500 authorized technical workshops.

== History ==
1901 - Foundation of Toledo Scale

The Toledo Scale Company is founded in Toledo, Ohio, USA;

1956 - Foundation of Toledo do Brasil

Foundation of Toledo do Brasil Indústria de Balanças Ltda. with the acquisition of a small scale factory and the absorption of the representation of the Toledo Scale Company in Brazil.

2003 - ISO/IEC 17025 Certification - Calibration Laboratory (headquarters in São Bernardo do Campo (SP))

RBC Calibration

2007 - Consolidation of operations

Consolidation of manufacturing, technical, commercial and administrative operations in a new plant in São Bernardo do Campo, SP. Lean manufacturing processes and an integrated SAP management system were implemented. The built area has 21,500 m² on a plot of 60,000 m².

2025 - Strengthening of Cloud Prix, a SaaS solution for store management and industrial weighing, and opening of the Sorocaba Branch – SP.

== Solutions ==
Toledo do Brasil's products include more than a hundred weighing products for static or dynamic applications, measuring from tenths of a milligram to hundreds of tons. These products include road or rail scales, scales for retail, bulk loading, bagging and filling, floor scales, bench scales, animal scales, laboratory scales and personal scales.

== International Partnerships ==
ABM COMPANY S.R.L (Milan, Italy) - Food and meat slicers;

DATALOGIC S.P.A (Bologna, Italy) - Scanner Scales and barcode readers;

MEASUREMENT SYSTEMS INTERNATIONAL (Seattle, Washington, USA) - Crane and hoist scales;

METTLER-TOLEDO AG (Greifensee, Switzerland) - Scales, terminals e load cells;

METTLER-TOLEDO CARGOSCAN AG (Greifensee, Switzerland) - Dimensioning equipment;

PRICER AB (Stockholm, Sweden) - Electronic labels for shelves, shelf and pallet racks;

RADWAG BALANCES AND SCALES (Radom, Poland) - Precision balances, analytical balances and weighing instruments;

RAILWEIGHT (Smethwick, West Midlands, Inglaterra) - Dynamic train weighing systems;

SYSTEC GmbH (Cologne, Germany) - Weighing Systems;

WIPOTEC GmbH (OCS) (Kaiserslautern, Germany) - High-precision checkweighers;

CUBISCAN (Farmington, Utah, USA) - Dimensioning equipment.

== Integrated Management System ==
Toledo do Brasil's IMS policy aims to satisfy customers by providing solutions through products and services that meet their needs.

Promote the commitment to continuous improvement in the use of the organization's inputs and resources, comply with relevant legislation, protect the environment, encourage employee participation, operate ethically and within safe and healthy conditions, eliminating hazards and reducing occupational health and safety risks.

Create value for employees, customers, suppliers, business partners, investors, government and society.

In August 2017, the Toledo do Brasil Calibration Laboratory, located in Salvador-BA, underwent evaluation by Cgcre and obtained Accreditation Certificate number 0658.
